The 2012–13 season of U.S. Alessandria Calcio 1912's was their 92nd in Italian football and their 16th in Lega Pro Seconda Divisione (former Serie C2).

Key dates
26 August: gaining only 1-point in the two games against Pavia and Savona, Alessandria is eliminated in the first qualification round of Coppa Italia Lega Pro.
2 September: Alessandria wins its championship debut match against Fano with a considerable 0–6 away.
12 May: with a 1–1 draw away to Bellaria Igea, Alessandria finished the season in 8th position.

Club

Management
Chairman: Maurizio Pavignano
Consulors: Valerio Bonanno, Paolo Camagna, Gianluigi Capra and Gisella Villata
General Secretary: Stefano Toti
Amministrative Secretary: Federica Rosina
Secretary: Stefano Carlet
Communication: Gigi Poggio
PR: Mario Risciglione
Supporters Communication: Emanuele Bellingeri
Referees Communication: Guido Nardone
Marketing: Massimiliano Baroglio, Alberto Viarengo, Antonio Visca and Carlo Zoccola

Coaching staff
Sporting Director: Massimiliano Menegatti
Coach: Egidio Notaristefano
Vice Coach: Giampaolo Ceramicola
Goalkeepers Coach: Gianluigi Gasparoni
Fitness Coach: Andrea Bocchio
Team Manager: Andrea La Rosa
Observer: Fabio Artico
Warehouser: Gianfranco Sguaizer

Medical staff
Director: Guido Ferraris
Team Doctor: Biagio Polla
Masseur: Luigi Marostica

Players

Transfers

In

Out

Profiles and statistics

Legend:

Matches

Lega Pro Seconda Divisione

Coppa Italia Lega Pro

Championship statistics

Results by round

Results summary

References

Alessandria
U.S. Alessandria Calcio 1912 seasons